{{DISPLAYTITLE:C20H23N3O2}}
The molecular formula C20H23N3O2 (molar mass: 337.41 g/mol, exact mass: 337.1790 u) may refer to:

 LSM-775, or N-Morpholinyllysergamide
 E-52862, or S1RA